John Nicolson (14 April 1917 – 7 October 1992) was an Australian cricketer. He played four first-class matches for Tasmania between 1936 and 1939.

See also
 List of Tasmanian representative cricketers

References

External links
 

1917 births
1992 deaths
Australian cricketers
Tasmania cricketers
Cricketers from Tasmania